William Allen (1870 – 11 September 1945) was a politician in Britain who served as a Member of Parliament (MP) from 1892 to 1900, and – after a gap of more than thirty years – from 1931 to 1935.

Allen was the son of William Shepherd Allen, also an MP. He first entered the House of Commons at the 1892 general election. Aged only 22, he was elected as the Liberal Party MP for Newcastle-under-Lyme, defeating the incumbent Liberal Unionist MP, Douglas Coghill. He was re-elected at the 1895 election, but was defeated at the 1900 general election. This was on account of his active service in the Second Boer War.

He did not seek election again until the 1924 general election, when he stood as a Constitutionalist candidate in the Burslem constituency. In 1924, Constitutionalist candidates were either Unionist or Liberal candidates who were supported by both local party associations. As a group, they wished to see the return of a Coalition Government. Allen narrowly lost the two-way contest to his Labour Party opponent Andrew MacLaren.

Allen did not stand in 1929, but when he stood as a Constitutionalist/National candidate at the 1931 general election he won the seat from MacLaren. After the election Allen took the Liberal National whip in the House of Commons. MacLaren regained the seat, defeating Allen at the 1935 general election. Allen did not stand again.

He lived at the Allen family home, Woodhead Hall, in Cheadle.

References

External links 
 

1870 births
1945 deaths
Military personnel from Staffordshire
Liberal Party (UK) MPs for English constituencies
UK MPs 1892–1895
UK MPs 1895–1900
National Liberal Party (UK, 1931) politicians
UK MPs 1931–1935
British military personnel of the Second Boer War
Members of the Parliament of the United Kingdom for Newcastle-under-Lyme
English barristers